Eat a Mango is the fourth album by Afropop music group Mango Groove. It was released by Tusk Music in November 1995.  In 1996, Eat a Mango won a SAMA in the category "Best Adult Contemporary Performance: English" at the second annual South African Music Awards. The band recorded music videos for three songs from the album: "Eat a Mango", "New World (Beneath Our Feet)", and "Right Time".

Eat a Mango was the last studio album Mango Groove released until Bang the Drum in 2009. In the interim, the band members pursued other creative projects. In a 2014 interview, lead singer Claire Johnston offered an explanation for the hiatus: "We experienced a creative lull. It happens to everyone; and I really learned a lot about myself during that time. I joined Mango Groove at such a young age, I needed to go out on my own and explore…".

Releases

Eat a Mango was released on CD in 1995 by both Gallo Record Company and Fresh Music, an independent record label in South Africa. The two releases had different visual designs. The Gallo Record Company later reissued Eat a Mango for digital distribution via Amazon Music, eMusic, iTunes, and Spotify. They reissued it on CD in 2011, in a release that also included the band's 1990 album, Hometalk. This CD reissue was part of the label's "Two on One Collection" series. Both this edition and the digital release omit the song "New World (Beneath Our Feet)", and include "We Are Waiting"—a song that originally appeared on Hometalk.

Reception
Drum magazine gave the album a favourable review, describing it as "a rocking collection of upbeat sounds celebrating life and love the Southern African way". The reviewer praised the album for being catchy and danceable, but added the following criticism: "The only negative thing I can say about this album is that some of the tracks sound too much like 'Dance Some More' and 'Another Country', which were big hits for the band. Perhaps they should explore some new ground."

Track listing

References

External links
 
 

1995 albums
Mango Groove albums